Nanthakumar Kaliappan (born 13 October 1977) or better known as K. Nanthakumar is a former Malaysian footballer. He played as a defensive midfielder. He was a member of the Malaysian national team. He is now currently a fitness coach for MISC-MIFA

Career
He is renowned for his physical appearance which is always quoted to overshadow many strikers in the Malaysian League. Having a six feet tall physique, Nanthakumar is not only tough in defend but also can even score a goal for Perak FA. 

He had represented Malaysia since the 2002 Tiger Cup. From then onwards, he has been a regular on the national team. He helped Malaysia to finish third in the 2004 Tiger Cup and even made a semi final appearance during the 2007 ASEAN Football Championship. Furthermore, he was chosen to be on the national team for the 2007 AFC Asian Cup, where he played in all of Malaysia's matches. He was also part of the 2006 and 2010 FIFA World Cup qualifying squad.

Honours

Club
Perak FA
 Liga Perdana 1: 2002, 2003
 Malaysia FA Cup: 2004
 Malaysia Cup: 1998, 2000
 Piala Sumbangsih: 1999

Selangor FA
 Malaysia Super League: 2009
 Malaysia FA Cup: 2009
 Piala Sumbangsih: 2009

MISC-MIFA
 Malaysia FAM Cup: 2016

References

External links
 K. Nanthakumar's Profile at F.A.M. website
 

1977 births
Living people
Malaysian footballers
Malaysia international footballers
2007 AFC Asian Cup players
Malaysian sportspeople of Indian descent
Malaysian people of Tamil descent
Malaysian Hindus
Tamil sportspeople
People from Perak
Perak F.C. players
MISC-MIFA players
Kelantan FA players
Selangor FA players
Negeri Sembilan FA players
Malaysia Super League players
Association football midfielders